Simply Business - the trading name of Xbridge Ltd - is an online broker of business insurance. 

In March 2017 it was announced that The Travelers Companies led by Alan Schnitzer agreed to acquire Simply Business from Aquiline Capital Partners LLC for an enterprise value of approximately $490 million with a successful completion of the deal made in August 2017.

History
Xbridge was founded in 2000 by Brad Liebmann, Ralph Arnold, Deno Fischer and Jim Nelson, who provided £1 million in seed capital. 
In 2005 the company chose to specialise in small business insurance, launching an online quote comparison service.

In July 2013 it was announced that the company had completed a management buy-out backed by the private equity firm AnaCap Financial Partners LLP.

The company has more than 800 employees.

References

Online insurance companies
Insurance companies of the United Kingdom
Financial services companies established in 2000